Canon EOS 1000D is a 10.1-megapixel digital single-lens reflex camera announced by Canon on 10 June 2008 and started shipping in mid August 2008.  It is known as the EOS Kiss F in Japan and the EOS Rebel XS in the United States and Canada.  The 1000D is an entry-level DSLR that has been described as being a step below the 450D.

The camera shares a few features with the 450D. It offers Live View shooting, DIGIC III Image Processor, and SDHC media storage.  However, it has seven focus points (opposed to nine) and does not have spot light metering.  The 1000D is also the second Canon EOS model (after the 450D) to exclusively use SD card and SDHC memory storage instead of CompactFlash.

Features
 10.1 effective megapixel APS-C CMOS sensor.
 Sensor Size : APS-C 22 mm ×14 mm
 Sensor Crop Factor: 1.6×
 DIGIC III Image Processor.
  TFT color LCD monitor with 230,000-dot resolution.
 Wide-area 7-point AF with center cross-type sensors.
 EOS Self Cleaning Sensor Unit.
 Continuous Drive up to 3 frames per second for as many JPEG files or up to 1.5 frames per second for 5 RAW files or 4 RAW+JPEG files.
 ISO sensitivity 100–1600.
 Canon EF/EF-S lenses.
 NTSC/PAL video output.
 File formats include: JPEG, RAW (12-bit Canon original).
 Custom Functions (C.Fn) Such as Exposure Level Increment by f-stop etc.
 Canon LP-E5 battery pack, battery life (shots per charge) approx. 190–600 without flash or 180–500 with 50% flash use.
 Approx. weight .

Reception
The 1000D has garnered positive reviews from independent photography review websites.

Video recording and conferencing
Canon Live View with resolution 768x512 px can be recorded directly to a computer (not internal memory) with software:
 EOS-movrec (open source)
 Canon EOS Utility 2
Video conferencing can be done with the same resolution with EOS Webcam Utility 1.1 (not listed in the officially supported cameras, but it works)

References

External links
Canon EOS 1000D Product Page

1000D
Live-preview digital cameras
Cameras introduced in 2008